The  are film-specific prizes awarded by the Hochi Shimbun.

Categories 
Best Picture
Best International Picture
Best Animated Picture (since 2017)
Best Actor
Best Actress
Best Supporting Actor
Best Supporting Actress
Best New Artist
Special Award
Best Director

Winner

External links
 Hochi Film Awards official site 
 List of awards on IMDB 

1976 establishments in Japan
Awards established in 1976
Japanese film awards
Recurring events established in 1976